Oracle VM Server for x86 is the server virtualization offering from Oracle Corporation. Oracle VM Server for x86 incorporates the free and open-source Xen hypervisor technology, supports Windows, Linux, and Solaris guests and includes an integrated Web based management console. Oracle VM Server for x86 features fully tested and certified Oracle Applications stack in an enterprise virtualization environment.

Oracle VM Server for x86 can be freely downloaded through Oracle Software Delivery Cloud. Oracle announced the general availability of Oracle VM 3.4.6 at 30 November 2018.

Components
 Oracle VM Manager: web based management console to manage Oracle VM Servers. 
 Oracle VM Server: includes a version of Xen hypervisor technology, and the Oracle VM Agent to communicate with Oracle VM Manager for management of virtual machines. It also includes a minimized Linux kernel as Dom0.

Versions
 3.4.6.3 - 3 June 2020
Export VMs to Oracle Cloud Infrastructure (OCI)
security updates
cumulative bug fixes
 3.4.6.2 - 13 December 2019
Additional Linux guest OS support (Oracle Linux 8.x, Red Hat Enterprise Linux 8.x, and CentOS 8.x)
security updates
cumulative bug fixes
new release model
 3.4.6.1 - 18 June 2019
updated versions of the Oracle VM Manager and Oracle VM Agent for SPARC
security updates
cumulative bug fixes
 3.4.6 - 30 November 2018
Updated Xen hypervisor
Update to the dom0 kernel
Security and patch updates for Oracle VM Server for x86 packages
Security and patch updates for Oracle VM Manager components
New User-Defined Validity in Months Option for Self-Signed SSL Certificates
New Option to Change the Location of a Running Virtual Machine 
Increased Virtual CPU Configuration Limit for HVM and PVHVM
3.4.5 - 7 June 2018
Support for Hybrid Columnar Compression (HCC) for better Oracle Database performance
A new Fiber Channel storage refresh option with Oracle generic storage plugin deployments
A new Balance Server start policy to complement the Best Server policy
Increased performance for Microsoft Windows guest operating systems
Support for TLS1.2 as the default connectivity protocol
Update to the dom0 kernel
Updated Xen hypervisor
Security and patch updates for Oracle VM Manager components
Security and patch updates for Oracle VM Server for x86 packages
3.4.4 - 25 August 2017
Unbreakable Enterprise Kernel Release 4 (UEK R4)
 Server package updates
 Security updates for Manager components and Server packages
 Updated Xen hypervisor for improved throughput and IOPS performance
Support for Microsoft Windows Server 2016
Support for Skylake processors
 3.4.3 - 12 May 2017
The ability to run Microsoft Windows Server Failover Clustering (WSFC) with the Oracle VM Windows PV Driver 3.4.2
Enhanced RAID functionality, with support for software RAID devices
Manager performance and supportability enhancements
Simplified UEFI PXE boot process for Oracle VM Server for x86
Updated Unbreakable Enterprise Kernel Release 4 and updates to other server packages
Security updates for manager components and server packages
 3.4.2 - September 2016
 Includes an updated DOM0 kernel based on the 4.1 mainline kernel via Oracle Unbreakable Enterprise Kernel (UEK) Release 4 update 2.
 Adds NVME support, extended SCSI support in the guest OS, numerous performance improvements in the host and guest OS, Oracle VM manager performance and scalability improvements, and security improvements.
Extended SCSI functionality available for virtual machines
 3.4.1 - April, 2016
 Support for Oracle VM Virtual Appliances
Automated installation of VNC and Serial Console software
Storage live migration
User interface enhancements for virtual disk allocation
Fiber Channel over Ethernet (FCoE) support      
Booting from UEFI      
Dom0 kernel upgraded
Increased supported limits      
Improved performance

Resource limits
As of version 3.4.6, Oracle VM Server for x86 can take advantage of up to 384 CPUs (Tested) / 2048 CPUs (Designed), 6TB RAM per server and can host a maximum of 300 VM per server. 
VCPUs per VM: 256 (PVM) / 128 (HVM, PVHVM) VMs per server, 1 TB RAM

End of life
As of March 2021 premier support has ended, although extended support is available until March 31, 2024 

https://blogs.oracle.com/virtualization/post/announcing-oracle-vm-3-extended-support

See also
 Docker
 Kernel-based Virtual Machine
 libvirt
 Oracle VM Server for SPARC

References

External links
 

Oracle software
Virtualization software